Cristal Falls is a waterfall in the Cristal Mountains of Brazil. It is located in the city of Santo Antônio do Rio Abaixo in the state of Minas Gerais.

Waterfalls of Brazil
Landforms of Minas Gerais